Juris George Mikelsons is a former airline executive and airline pilot in the United States and the founder of ATA Airlines. He was born in Riga, Latvia, in 1938 on the eve of World War II. His family fled to Germany during the mid-1940s to escape the Soviet occupation of the Baltic states.

Early years 
As a child, Mikelsons would peer out of bomb shelters to catch any glimpse he could of the planes being flown in the skies. This was the birth of his passion in life, which was to fly planes. His family moved to Indianapolis, Indiana, during the 1950s where his father was offered a job as a violinist for the Indianapolis Symphony Orchestra.

Mikelsons finally began pursuing his passion when he saw a sign offering flights for under $10. It was then that he flew for the first time. This flight sparked his desire to enter the aviation industry. He immediately began flying lessons and became chief pilot and director of the Voyager 1000 travel club.

Founding of ATA Airlines 
In 1973, Mikelsons started his own travel club, Ambassadair, taking a loan and mortgaging his home to purchase a Boeing 720, which he titled "Miss Indy". Ambassadair was a charter-based airline which provided cheap vacation fares. Mikelsons and an employee piloted the plane, loaded the luggage, cleaned the cabin, and served as the tour guide. His hard work and determination allowed him to purchase additional planes for his charter-based airline service. In 1984, after the deregulation of the Airline industry, Mikelsons formed Amtran, Inc., the former parent company of American Trans Air, which later became ATA Airlines, headquartered near Indianapolis International Airport. He also formed ATA Leisure Corp., Amber Travel, ATA Training Corp., ATA Cargo, and ExecuJet.

In 1993, ATA made its initial public offering, trading on the NASDAQ National Market System under the symbol "AMTR". Mikelsons, a noted conservative always notorious for putting his money where his mouth is, purchased a 75% stake in the company. In 1998, Mikelsons retired, giving the reigns of the company to John Tague. Tague began a massive expansion with new aircraft and the establishment of a hub at Chicago's Midway airport. After the September 11 terrorist attacks in 2001, the slump in airline travel and rising fuel costs severely impacted ATA.

Mikelsons came out of retirement to save his troubled airline despite his archaic managerial style.  Many of ATA's finest leaders left because of this.  ATA emerged from bankruptcy on February 28, 2006  after Mikelson had secured a major code-share agreement with Southwest Airlines. Upon emergence from bankruptcy, Mikelson retired from ATA and its airline holdings, turning the reins of the company to a MatlinPatterson lead board of directors and former Southwest executive John G. Denison. ATA Airlines filed for bankruptcy protection again on April 2, 2008, and announced the discontinuation of all operations "following the loss of a key contract for our military charter business", ATA said on its website.

Personal information 
Mikelsons and his wife Muriel live near Indianapolis and have two children (Jay and David Mikelsons). He is the 1996 recipient of the Tony Jannus Award for outstanding leadership in the commercial aviation industry. Mikelsons owns and flies a Bell Jet Ranger III helicopter. His wife Muriel is a concert violinist. They are active in a number of area charitable organizations, including the Indianapolis Children's Museum and the Indianapolis Symphony Orchestra.

ATA Airlines chronology

References

External links 
ATA Airlines official website

Living people
1938 births
Latvian World War II refugees
Soviet emigrants to the United States
Businesspeople from Indianapolis
American aviators
Businesspeople in aviation
American airline chief executives
Commercial aviators